Andrew Keeling is a classical composer.

Works
Andrew Keeling has written music for the likes of Opus 20 (Meditatio 1989), Het Trio (Distant Skies, Mountains and Shadows 1992), The Hilliard Ensemble (O Ignis Spiritus 1993), The Apollo Saxophone Quartet (Wrestling with Angels 1993), the BBC Philharmonic Orchestra (Upon the Edge of Autumn 1994), Evelyn Glennie (Concerto Nekyia 1995), The Goldberg Ensemble (Hidden Streams 1995), Fretwork (Afterwords 1999), Virelai (With How Sad Steps, O Moon 2000), Jacob Heringman (Black Sun 2001), Gothic Voices (Powered by Joy 2002), Matthew Wadsworth (MirAre 2002), Catherine King and Jacob Heringman (Eye of Heart... 2002), Alison Wells and Ian Mitchell (Pirate Things 2006) and many others.

Some of Keeling's music has appeared on CD releases distributed by the Discipline Global Mobile, Burning Shed, and Riverrun record labels, as well as being performed and broadcast worldwide. It is published by Faber, PRB, Staunch and Alto Publications.

Since the late 1960s, Keeling has been a keen advocate of the music of Robert Fripp and King Crimson. In 1999, Keeling was invited by Robert Fripp to arrange new versions of the King Crimson's music, as well as some of Fripp's solo guitar Soundscapes. Some of the resulting pieces have been performed, broadcast and recorded by The Metropole Orchestra of Amsterdam, and there are plans for a CD release on Fripp's DGM label. Andrew Keeling is also co-author with Mark Graham of A Musical Guide to King Crimson, a series of books, the first being "Musical Guide to In the Court of the Crimson King by King Crimson" published in August 2009. Musical Guides to Larks' Tongues in Aspic and In the Wake Poseidon follow with plans for further books in the series. He has also been a part-time lecturer at the University of Liverpool and the Royal Northern College of Music in Manchester and performs in an improvisation duo with former King Crimson violinist David Cross. Their album English Sun was released in 2009.

References

External links 

 Burning Shed, the label responsible for releasing Andrew Keeling's Blue Dawn (2007) and Reclaiming Eros (2005) albums

Year of birth missing (living people)
Living people
English classical composers
21st-century classical composers
Discipline Global Mobile artists
English male classical composers
21st-century British male musicians